Tom & Jerry Kids (formerly known as Tom & Jerry Kids Show in the first season) is an American animated comedy television series co-produced by Hanna-Barbera and Turner Entertainment Co., and starring the cat-and-mouse duo Tom and Jerry as toddlers (toddler kitten and baby mouse). It premiered on Fox on September 8, 1990, airing as the first program of the children's programming block, Fox Kids, and was the second Tom and Jerry TV series to be produced by Hanna-Barbera following The Tom and Jerry Show in 1975.

The series is somewhat similar to the "older" version of the original theatricals, partly akin to being produced by creators William Hanna and Joseph Barbera, founders of Hanna-Barbera and former MGM cartoon studio staff.

Segments

Tom and Jerry Kids 
The Tom and Jerry Kids cartoons are based on the classic shorts, Tom and Jerry, but it stars the kitten and mouseling instead. They remain silent like their older selves and both of them are attempting to outwit each other, exactly like in the original shorts. Some of the plots and gags are recycled from old Tom and Jerry cartoons, but the violence is toned down for younger viewers.

Spike and Tyke 
The Spike and Tyke segments are based on the characters, Spike and Tyke from the original Tom and Jerry series. Strangely, Spike is still an adult and Tyke is slightly older in this series. Spike still loves his son, Tyke, more than anything and enjoys spending time with him. Additionally, Tyke now has the ability to talk, which mean that he has grown smarter and more intelligent. Spike's toughness is only used on occasions, as these segments mostly revolve around his love for his son and on teaching family values. Additionally, Spike and Tyke are grey like their debut appearances in the classic Tom and Jerry shorts, with Tyke wearing a blue collar.

Droopy and Dripple 
The Droopy and Dripple segments feature characters from the classic Tex Avery shorts starring Droopy. Droopy has a different job every episode and his son Dripple (a tinier, identical version of him) always follows him as his assistant. The two will usually end up clashing with McWolf, the before-unnamed villainous wolf from Avery shorts that, envious of their success, will use any dirty trick against them to win, but inevitably fails. The beautiful Miss Vavoom (Red in Avery shorts) is another possible source of conflict between the two, as both of them have a crush on her and she, or a kiss from her, is often the prize of some sort of competition. Their "detective" segments were later spun-off into Droopy, Master Detective.

Blast-Off Buzzard 
Season 4 features a new adaption of the Blast-Off Buzzard segment from the CB Bears where the characters actually talk. In these segments, Blast-Off Buzzard leads his gang of Buzzards as they try to catch Crazylegs. Only two episodes were made.

Episodes

Voice cast 
 Charlie Adler – Dripple, Lightning Bolt the Super Squirrel, Crazylegs, Rap Rat (in "Rap Rat is Where It's At"), Urfo's Mother (in "Urfo Returns")
 William Callaway – Slowpoke Antonio
 Patrick Fraley – Kyle the Cat, Yolker (in "Super Droop and Dripple Boy Meet the Yolker"), Zebra (in "Love Me, Love My Zebra"), Tyrone the Tiny (in "Barbecue Bust-Up")
 Keenon Douglas - Jerry (speaking)
 Teresa Ganzel – Miss Vavoom, Lt. Lucy (in "Mess Hall Mouser"), White Tabby (in "Tom Thumped")
 Dick Gautier – Spike
 Phil Hartman – Calaboose Cal, Hot Dog Vendor (in "Pound Hound") Inspector De Paws (in "Pound Hound")
 Don Messick – Droopy, Bat Mouse (in "Bat Mouse"), Narrator (in "Scourge of the Sky")
 Frank Welker – Tom, Jerry, McWolf, Wild Mouse, Urfo, Moncy, Bat Cat (in "Bat Mouse"), Ants (in "This is No Picnic"), Caveman (in "Prehistoric Pals"), Chino the Kitten (in "Who Are You Kitten"), Commander (in "Scourge of the Sky"), Jester (in "When Knights Were Cold"), Male Mouse Students (in "Chase School"), Martian Mouse (in "Martian Mouse"), Museum Manager (in "The Watchcat"), Narrator (in "Wild Mouse II"), Salesmouse (in "S.O.S. Ninja"), Stinky Jr. (in "Fallen Archers," "Order in the Volley Ball Court"), Urfo Catcher (in "Urfo Returns"), Momma Seagull, Elephants, Rhino, Ostrich, Lions, and Gorilla, (in "Cast Away Tom"), Zap Men (in "Maze Monster Zap Men")
 Patric Zimmerman – Tyke

Additional Voices 

 Brandon Adams
 Joe Alaskey
 Patricia Alice Albrecht
 Lewis Arquette
 Rene Auberjonois
 Michael Bell
 Gregg Berger
 Susan Blu
 Sorrell Booke
 Charlie Brill
 Nicole Brown
 Scott Bullock
 Arthur Burghardt
 Greg Burson
 Hamilton Camp
 Nancy Cartwright
 Marsha Clark
 Selette Cole
 Townsend Coleman
 Danny Cooksey
 Bud Cort
 Jesse Corti
 Peter Cullen
 Brian Cummings - Clyde
 Jim Cummings
 Tim Curry
 Jennifer Darling
 Mari Devon
 Nancy Dussault
 Maggie Egan
 June Foray
 Brad Garrett
 Kathy Garver
 Joan Gerber
 Barry Gordon
 Archie Hahn
 Pamela Hayden
 George Hearn
 Dana Hill
 Jerry Houser
 Tony Jay
 Arte Johnson

 Vicki Juditz
 Zale Kessler
 Kip King
 Paul Kreppel
 Maurice LaMarche
 David Lander
 Allan Lurie
 Sherry Lynn
 Tress MacNeille
 Kenneth Mars
 Chuck McCann
 Edie McClurg
 Diane Michelle
 Brian Mitchell
 Alan Oppenheimer
 Bibi Osterwald
 Gary Owens
 Patricia Parris
 Rob Paulsen
 Pat Pinney
 Henry Polic II
 Tony Pope
 Hal Rayle
 Clive Revill
 Bob Ridgely
 Kimmy Robertson
 Stuart Robinson
 Roger Rose
 Neil Ross
 Ronnie Schell
 Susan Silo
 Hal Smith
 Kath Soucie
 Sally Struthers
 Barbara Stuart
 Marcelo Tubert
 Janet Waldo
 B.J. Ward
 Jimmy Weldon
 Jane Wiedlin
 Lee Wilkof
 April Winchell
 JoAnne Worley

Production and broadcast 
The series was a co-production between Hanna-Barbera and Turner Entertainment Co, serving as the former's second Tom and Jerry series after The Tom and Jerry Show in 1975. This is the first Tom and Jerry series to be produced by Turner Entertainment, after they had bought the Tom and Jerry franchise from Metro-Goldwyn-Mayer in 1986. Parent company Turner Broadcasting System would buy the Hanna-Barbera studios in late 1991 starting with the third season. Perhaps the most notable differences from the classic shorts are the pair's appearances (and ages). Tom & Jerry Kids was one of the last Saturday-morning cartoons from Hanna-Barbera before shifting focus toward producing shows specifically for Cartoon Network.

In 1994, Fox canceled the series and ended its run on Fox Kids on September 4, 1994, but it soon began airing in reruns on Cartoon Network (which Turner launched to showcase its large animation library, including the original Tom and Jerry) in 1995, and ended in 2007 when the show was removed from the Cartoon Network schedule and instead moved over to its sibling network Boomerang. Spacetoon aired this show from July 13, 2000 to December 31, 2004.

Home media 
In 1991, 12 episodes were put on two VHS cassettes in the United States, although only a few million copies were made. Eleven VHS cassettes were released in the United Kingdom. The series was released on DVD in Germany by Kinowelt Home Entertainment on July 11, 2008, as the first official DVD release. In 2010, the episode Flippin' Fido was included in the Deluxe Anniversary Collection DVD set with the original opening and closing titles restored, different from TV airing versions.

On April 30, 2013, Warner Home Video released the first season of the show on DVD for the first time. In the United Kingdom, Season One was released as 2 separate DVDs on August 12, 2013, under the titles Baby Tom and Jerry, as part of WB's Big Faces range. Like the U.S. release of Season One, Baby Tom includes the first seven half-hour episodes, while Baby Jerry includes the remaining 6 episodes.

Awards 
This show was given a Daytime Emmy nomination in 1992 for Outstanding Music Direction and Composition.

Comic book 
In Mexico, Editorial Vid made a comic book based on Tom & Jerry Kids in 1990. It is worth noting that Tom and Jerry (the original older versions) have their own comic book here, and the Tom & Jerry Kids comic book is followed by Tom and Jerry.

See also 

 The Tom and Jerry Show (1975)
 The Tom and Jerry Comedy Show
 Tom and Jerry Tales
 The Tom and Jerry Show (2014)
 Tom and Jerry Special Shorts
 Tom and Jerry in New York
 List of Tom & Jerry Kids episodes
 List of characters in Tom & Jerry Kids
 List of works produced by Hanna-Barbera Productions

Notes

References

External links 
 

1990 American television series debuts
1993 American television series endings
1990s American animated television series
1990s American children's comedy television series
1990s American surreal comedy television series
1990s American animated comedy television series
American animated television spin-offs
American animated variety television series
American children's animated comedy television series
American prequel television series
Animated television series about cats
Animated television series about children
Animated television series about mice and rats
English-language television shows
Fox Broadcasting Company original programming
Television series set in the 1990s
Television series by Hanna-Barbera
Kids
Child versions of cartoon characters